Prema is a 2002 Indian Kannada-language film written and directed by Suresh Raj. It stars Prema as the titular protagonist, and Shivadhwaj. The supporting cast features Lakshmi, Vijay, and Dharma.

Cast 

 Prema as Prema
 Shivadhwaj as Prashanth 
 Lakshmi as Prema's mother
 Vijay as Dr. Vijay Kumar
 Dharma as Dharma 
 Sanketh Kashi
 Chethan
 Pavan
 Arun Nagesh
 Raj
 Raksha (credited as Baby Raksha) as Appi
 Avesh Rao (credited as Master Avesh Rao) as Rajesh

Soundtrack 

The soundtrack and film score were composed by K. Kalyan, who also wrote lyrics for the tracks. The soundtrack album consists of six tracks.

Track listing

References 

2002 films
2000s Kannada-language films